Two Monkeys is an album by the punk rock band Cock Sparrer, released in 1997. It was initially released in Germany.

Critical reception
AllMusic wrote: "Pick up the original as a collector's item, but save your ears for the 2009 Captain Oi! reissue, which remixes the original master tapes and reveals the album for the all-round masterpiece it ought to have been." The Sunderland Echo called the songs "anthemic street punk in classic Sparrer style."

Track listing
 A.U.
 Before the Flame Die
 Tart
 Lies?
 East End Girl
 Anthem
 Time To Be Me
 I Live in Marbella
 Bats Out
 Battersea Bardot
 I Feel a Death Coming On
 Back Home
 Goodbye

References

1997 albums
Cock Sparrer albums